Entesa may refer to one of the following political parties or alliances:

Entesa Catalana de Progrés, electoral alliance of the PSC, ERC and ICV–EUiA for the 2000, 2004 and 2008 Spanish Senate elections in Catalonia.
Entesa d'Eivissa, political party in Ibiza.
Entesa de l'Esquerra de Menorca, electoral alliance of the Socialist Party of Menorca and Esquerra de Menorca for the 1987 and 1991 Balearic regional elections in Menorca.
Entesa dels Catalans, electoral alliance of the PSC–C, FSC, PSUC, ERC and Estat Català for the 1977 Spanish Senate election in Catalonia.
Entesa dels Nacionalistes d'Esquerra, political party in Catalonia between 1985 and 1987.
Entesa pel Progrés de Catalunya, electoral alliance of the PSC and ICV–EUiA for the 2011 Spanish Senate election in Catalonia.
Entesa per Mallorca, political party in Majorca that existed between 2006 and 2013.
Esquerra Unida–L'Entesa, electoral alliance of EUPV, IR, EV, EVPV and EV–EE for the 2003 Valencian, 2004 Spanish and 2004 European Parliament elections in the Valencian Community.
Nova Entesa, electoral alliance of the PSC and ERC for the 1979 Spanish Senate election in Catalonia.
Per l'Entesa, electoral alliance of the PSUC and PTC for the 1979 Spanish Senate election in Catalonia.
PSM–Entesa Nacionalista, political party in the Balearic Islands.